The True Meaning of Christmas Special is a Canadian television Christmas special, hosted by Dave Foley. It was first broadcast on CBC Television on December 22, 2002.

Synopsis
Dave Foley has reached a milestone in his career, He is hosting his first Christmas special, live from the beach, featuring surf-guitar legend, Dick Dale. The special seems to be going well, but as Dave begins to try to sell kitchen gadgets to the television audience, he senses there is something wrong with his Special; but can't place his finger on it. After some deliberation, he decides to move the beach party north to Canada, depicted as a snow-covered cabin, which strangely appears to be located only fifty feet from the beach.

Upon arriving, Dave teams up with El Vez ("The Mexican Elvis"), Elvis Stojko, Bing Crosby, Thomas the Butler, Santa Dude, Mike Myers, and "The Ghosts of Christmas Specials Past, Present, and Yet to Come".

He consults a priest and many of his new friends, but cannot gain passion for his Christmas special.

Eventually, Dave dreams about "Christmas Specials Yet to Come", which is a future reminiscent of Soylent Green, only with Christmas specials. He wakes with a start when he discovers that in the future, there are people-flavored chips, and that the people chips are made from people. He resumes his Christmas special with added fervor, as El Vez and Dick Dale party the night away.

Cast
(in credits order)

Dave Foley as Himself/David Bowie
Jann Arden as The Ghost of Christmas Specials Present
Dick Dale as Himself
Joe Flaherty as Bing Crosby
Tom Green as Thomas, the butler
Crissy Guerrero as El Vette
Lisa Hockly as El Vette
Paul Irving as Lodge Manager
Robert 'El Vez' López as Himself
Kevin McDonald as The Ghost of Christmas Specials Yet To Come
Mike Myers as Himself
Jason Priestley as Santa Dude
Andy Richter as Priest
Elvis Stojko as Himself
Dave Thomas as The Ghost of Christmas Specials Past (Bob Hope)

See also
 List of Christmas films

External links

Christmas television specials
CBC Television original programming
2002 television specials